Cathkin Secondary School is a school in Cape Town, Western Cape, South Africa.

References

Schools in Cape Town